The Korjenić-Neorić Armorial is a 1595 copy of the lost original of the Ohmućević Armorial (Ohmućevićev grbovnik) commissioned by Petar Ohmućević (died 1599), a Spanish admiral of Ragusan origin, at some point between 1584 and 1594.  It is an example of the earliest ("Interconfessional") form of Illyrism, which formed the ideological basis for the later rise of South Slavic nationalism in Southeast Europe.

The armorial combines historical (late medieval) with fictional coats of arms to construct the notion of an "Illyrian Empire". This Empire happened to coincide exactly with the sphere of interest of the Spanish Empire in the Southeast Europe at the time, and hence also Petar's own. The personal purpose pursued by Petar Ohmućević was that of confirming his own "Illyrian" nobility after he rose to the rank of admiral in the Spanish navy. In order to qualify for the greater chivalric orders of Habsburg Spain at the time, it was necessary to prove descent from eight noble and purely Catholic great-grandparents.
Ohmućević was granted the status of nobleman in 1594, which is taken as the terminus ante quem of the armorial. Ohmućević's armorial can thus be considered a personal project in origin, or even a fraud, as he invented genealogy in order to qualify for the coveted title, but its influence turned out to be immense, becoming, as it did, the foundation of South Slavic or "Illyrist" heraldry in general. An important source for Ohmućević's heraldic inventions was the Wappenbüchlein by Virgil Solis (1555), which itself contains fictional arms of "foreign kingdoms". The Korjenić-Neorić Armorial of 1595 is printed on paper, in a format of  21 cm x 14.5 cm, on 168 sheets. The Ohmućević Armorial is the main source used by the Fojnica Armorial, which is for this reason dated to after 1595, probably to the 1670s, and later "Illyrist" armorials compiled in the early modern period. The armorial is today kept at the National and University Library in Zagreb.

References
Zrinka Blazevic, 'Indetermi-nation: Narrative identity and symbolic politics in early modern Illyrism', chapter 6 of: Whose Love of Which Country?: Composite States, National Histories and Patriotic Discourses in Early Modern East Central Europe, Balázs Trencsényi and  Márton Zászkaliczky (eds.),  BRILL, 2010, .
 Milic Milicevic, „Грб Србије, развој кроз историју“, Belgrade 1995,  .

External links

Грбовник Коренић-Неорић
Beogradski grbovnik II i njegovo mesto u ilirskoj heraldici  / Prevara Don Pedra (ciode.ca)

1595 books
Rolls of arms
Illyrian movement
Serbian heraldry
Serbian coats of arms
Croatian coats of arms
Bosnia and Herzegovina coats of arms
Bulgarian coats of arms